Burnham, also known as Burnham Camp, is the largest army base in New Zealand's South Island. It is located 28 kilometres south of Christchurch on the Canterbury Plains in the Selwyn District, close to the town of Dunsandel.
Burnham was named after Burnham Beeches, Buckinghamshire.

The senior headquarters at the camp has seen many changes. Previously Headquarters 3 Task Force, 3 Task Force Region, HQ Ready Reaction Force, and 3 Land Force Group have been based here. Most recently 3 Land Force Group was disbanded in 2011, and Headquarters Deployable Joint Task Force Headquarters - Land (DJTFHQ-L) was formed.

Demographics 

Burnham Camp had a population of 1,146 at the 2018 New Zealand census, an increase of 57 people (5.2%) since the 2013 census, and a decrease of 60 people (-5.0%) since the 2006 census. There were 249 households. There were 750 males and 393 females, giving a sex ratio of 1.91 males per female. The median age was 24.0 years (compared with 37.4 years nationally), with 201 people (17.5%) aged under 15 years, 681 (59.4%) aged 15 to 29, 255 (22.3%) aged 30 to 64, and 6 (0.5%) aged 65 or older.

Ethnicities were 75.7% European/Pākehā, 25.7% Māori, 9.9% Pacific peoples, 4.7% Asian, and 7.6% other ethnicities (totals add to more than 100% since people could identify with multiple ethnicities).

The proportion of people born overseas was 11.5%, compared with 27.1% nationally.

Although some people objected to giving their religion, 65.4% had no religion, 23.6% were Christian, 0.5% were Hindu, 0.3% were Muslim and 5.0% had other religions.

Of those at least 15 years old, 120 (12.7%) people had a bachelor or higher degree, and 48 (5.1%) people had no formal qualifications. The median income was $47,900, compared with $31,800 nationally. The employment status of those at least 15 was that 750 (79.4%) people were employed full-time, 81 (8.6%) were part-time, and 21 (2.2%) were unemployed.

Units at the camp

1st (New Zealand) Brigade

Combat Units 

 2/1st Battalion, Royal New Zealand Infantry Regiment 
 Alpha Company
 Bravo Company
 Charlie Company
 Delta Company
 Support Company
 Depot Company
 Combat Service Support Company

Combat Support Units 

 2nd Engineer Regiment, 
 3rd Field Squadron 
 3 Emergency Response Troop
 1st New Zealand Signal Regiment,
 3rd Signal Squadron (Electronic Warfare) 
 4th Signal Squadron
 25 Cypher Section

Combat Service Support Units 

 3rd Combat Service Support Battalion (Burnham Military Camp)
 3rd Transport Company
 3rd Catering & Supply Company
 3rd Workshop Company

Joint Support Group

Deployable Health Organisation 

 Southern Health Support Squadron
 Logistics Support Squadron

Force Health Organisation 

 Defence Health Centre
 Burnham Gymnasium

New Zealand Defence College 

 Defence Health School (NZ)
 Defence Learning Centre

Headquarters Training and Doctrine Command 

 Army Adventure Training Centre
 3 Regional Training wing

Lockheed Martin New Zealand 
Lockheed Martin New Zealand provides logistics services for the NZDF including Maintenance, Repair, and Overhaul, Managed Fleet Utilisation and warehousing.

 Maintenance, Repair and Overhaul team
 Managed Fleet Utilisation team

Other Units 
New Zealand Army Band
Youth Development Unit (YDU)
Services Correctional Establishment (SCE)
Joint Military Police Unit
Joint Logistic Support Agency service center
Human Resources service center

Medical training 

Medical training for the entire NZDF is conducted in Burnham at the New Zealand Defence Force Health School and all medics enlisted in the Army, Navy or Air Force are sent here for training.  Practical training and clinical placements are completed throughout the two and a half year program. Medics are then posted to their respective camps or bases.

Cadet force 

Burnham is also home to the Southern HQ of the New Zealand Cadet Forces (NZCF). They are the Air Training Corps (Air Force), Cadet Corps (Army), and Sea Cadet Corps (Navy).

Barracks 
The barracks in Burnham Camp are named after a miscellany of battles, campaigns, locations and overseas barracks in which New Zealand troops have been stationed.

Borneo Barracks 
Borneo Barracks Commemorates what is now known as the Indonesia–Malaysia confrontation of 1963–1966), the 1st Battalion, Royal New Zealand Infantry Regiment and the New Zealand Special Air Service both saw service in this conflict.

Cambrai Barracks 
Named after the Battle of Cambrai of Nov -Dec 1917 which saw the first mass use of tanks in battle.

Chunuk Bair Barracks 
Chunuk Bair Barracks are named after the August 1915 battle in which the Wellington Infantry Regiment (NZEF) occupied one of the highest points on the Gallipoli Peninsula.

Dieppe Barracks 
Dieppe Barracks are named after the Singapore garrison of the 1st Battalion, Royal New Zealand Infantry Regiment from 1971 to 1980.

Faenza Barracks 
Faenza Barracks are named after the Italian city of Faenza which New Zealand Division liberated over the period of 14–20 December 1944, during operations to break the German Gothic Line.

Gallipoli Barracks 
Gallipoli Barracks are named after the New Zealand's Army's first major campaign of the First World War.

Ipoh Barracks 
Ipoh Barracks are named after the town in Malaysia that the 1st Battalion of the New Zealand Regiment were garrisoned in from March 1958 to early 1959 during the Malayan Emergency.

Nee Soon Barracks 
Nee Soon Barracks are named after the Singapore garrison of the 1st Battalion, Royal New Zealand Infantry Regiment from 1969 to 1971.

Nui Dat Barracks 
Nui Dat Barracks are named after the operational base of the 1st Australian Task Force form 1965 to 1971, to which New Zealand contributed;

 One to two rifle companies (W and V Company, Royal New Zealand Infantry Regiment);
 One artillery battery (161st Battery, Royal New Zealand Artillery); and
 One New Zealand SAS troop.

Quinns Post Barracks 
Quinn's Post Barracks are named after one of the strongholds on the ANZAC line during the Gallipoli campaign.

Sangro Barracks 
Sangro Barracks are named after the 27/28 November 1943 crossing of the Sangro Rver which was a harsh introduction to the Italian Campaign for the 2nd New Zealand Division.

Sari Bair Barracks 
Sari Bair Barracks are named after a tangled mass of hills and watercourses inland from ANZAC Cove and Sulva Bay.

Suvla Barracks 
Suvla Barracks are named after the bay which lies at the north-western end of ANZAC Cove on the Gallipoli peninsula and was essentially the left flank of the Australian and New Zealand Army Corps.

Taiping Barracks 
Taiping Barracks are named after the town in Malaysia that in the late 1950s two New Zealand Battalions were garrisoned in during the Malayan emergency.

Terendak Barracks 
Terendak Barracks are named after the purpose built brigade camp in Malaysia that was occupied by the New Zealand Army form 1960 to 1969

Tobruk Barracks 
Tobruk Barracks are named after besieged Garrison of Tobruk in Libya which the 2nd New Zealand Division and 7th Armored Division helped relieve on 27 November 1941 during Operation Crusader.

Tui Barracks 
Tui Barracks were named after the New Zealand Women's War Service Auxiliary. Raised by Lady Freyberg to support New Zealand troops in Egypt, the ladies of the Women's War Service Auxiliary were unofficially called the Tuis.

Education
Burnham School is a full primary school catering for years 1 to 8.

Burnham Industrial School was a reform school set up in the mid 19th century. The school was still operating in 1909.

See also 

 Linton Military Camp
Hopuhopu Camp
 Papakura Military Camp
Trentham Military Camp
Waiouru Military Camp

References

Further reading 
 
 

Selwyn District
Populated places in Canterbury, New Zealand
Installations of the New Zealand Army
Military installations established in the 1920s